Pain Physician is an open-access peer-reviewed scientific journal publishing research in neurology. It is the official publication of the American Society of Interventional Pain Physicians.

According to the Journal Citation Reports, the journal had a 2015 impact factor of 3.407.

References

External links 
 

Publications established in 1999
English-language journals
Open access journals
8 times per year journals